Functional constipation, known as chronic idiopathic constipation (CIC), is constipation that does not have a physical (anatomical) or physiological (hormonal or other body chemistry) cause. It may have a neurological, psychological or psychosomatic cause. A person with functional constipation may be healthy, yet has difficulty defecating.

Symptoms and diagnosis
Chronic idiopathic constipation is similar to constipation-predominant irritable bowel syndrome (IBS-C); however, people with CIC do not have other symptoms of IBS, such as abdominal pain. Diagnosing CIC can be difficult as other syndromes must be ruled out as there is no physiological cause for CIC. Doctors will typically look for other symptoms, such as blood in stool, weight loss, low blood count, or other symptoms.

To be considered functional constipation, symptoms must be present at least a fourth of the time.
Possible causes are:
 Anismus
 Descending perineum syndrome
 Other inability or unwillingness to control the external anal sphincter, which normally is under voluntary control
 A poor diet
 An unwillingness to defecate
 Nervous reactions, including prolonged and/or chronic stress and anxiety, that close the internal anal sphincter, a muscle that is not under voluntary control
 Deeper psychosomatic disorders which sometimes affect digestion and the absorption of water in the colon
There is also possibility of presentation with other comorbid symptoms such as headache, especially in children.

Treatment
Treatment options appear similar and include prucalopride, lubiprostone, linaclotide, tegaserod, velusetrag, elobixibat, bisacodyl, sodium picosulphate, and most recently, plecanatide. In children and adolescents with functional constipation, the first line treatment is polyethylene glycol; while other treatments such as increasing fiber or water intake above daily recommended levels or probiotics have not been found to be helpful.

Research

A 2014 meta-analysis of three small trials evaluating probiotics showed a slight improvement in management of chronic idiopathic constipation, but well-designed studies are necessary to know the true efficacy of probiotics in treating this condition.

Children with functional constipation often claim to lack the sensation of the urge to defecate, and may be conditioned to avoid doing so due to a previous painful experience.  One retrospective study showed that these children did indeed have the urge to defecate using colonic manometry, and suggested behavioral modification as a treatment for functional constipation.

See also
Functional symptom
Sacral nerve stimulation

References

Constipation